Miravirsen (INN; codenamed SPC3649) is an experimental drug for the treatment of hepatitis C, being developed by Santaris Pharma.  As of 2017 it was in Phase II clinical trials.

Miravirsen had been given by subcutaneous injection in early clinical trials as of 2017.  It is antisense to a human microRNA called miR-122.  miR-122 ferries an argonaute protein to 5'-UTR region of viral RNA, where it binds, protecting the RNA from being destroyed by normally present nucleases; by binding to miR-122, miravirsen removes that protection and the virus RNA can be destroyed. There is some evidence that the 5'-UTR region mutates under repeated exposure to miravirsen.

Miravirsen is a modified oligonucleotide consisting of a chain of 15 nucleotides, the base sequence of which is designed to selectively bind to miR-122. Seven of the 15 sugar units are deoxyriboses, and the other eight are riboses with an additional bridge between the 2' oxygen and the 4' carbon atoms; this makes the molecule a locked nucleic acid. Furthermore, the phosphate units have been replaced by thiophosphates.

The complete base sequence is
mC*-dC-A*-dT-dT-G*-mU*-dC-dA-mC*-dA-mC*-dT-mC*-mC* [d = 2'-deoxy, m = 5-methyl, * = 2'-O,4'-C-methylene, i.e. bridged or "locked" sugar]
with 3'→5' thiophosphate linkages.

References 

Anti–hepatitis C agents
Antisense RNA